Pseudocalotes andamanensis is an agamid lizard found on the Nicobar Islands and the Andaman Islands in India. It is also known as the green crestless forest lizard, Andaman and Nicobar forest lizard, Andaman lizard, or Andaman green calotes. This species is an almost exclusive canopy dweller, and is rarely seen.

The holotype of Pseudocalotes andamanensis is an adult male from the Andaman Islands collected by Frederick Adolph de Roepstorff in 1882. It was recently rediscovered in the Andaman Islands.

Taxonomy
This species formerly included Microauris aurantolabium from southern India, now reclassified as a distinct species.

References

Further reading
 
 
 
 

Pseudocalotes
Reptiles of India
Endemic fauna of India
Fauna of the Andaman and Nicobar Islands
Reptiles described in 1891
Taxa named by George Albert Boulenger